Allison Blair Jones Rushing (born 1982) is an American attorney and jurist serving as a United States circuit judge of the United States Court of Appeals for the Fourth Circuit since March 2019.

Early life, family, and education 
Born in Hendersonville, North Carolina, Rushing graduated from East Henderson High School in East Flat Rock, North Carolina. Rushing graduated summa cum laude and Phi Beta Kappa from Wake Forest University in 2004 with a Bachelor of Arts in music. In 2007, she earned her Juris Doctor, magna cum laude, from the Duke University School of Law. Rushing served as executive editor of the Duke Law Journal.

Rushing is a Baptist. She is married to Blake Rushing.

Career 
In 2005, Rushing was a law student intern at the Alliance Defending Freedom (ADF), a conservative Christian nonprofit organization. Rushing wrote or co-wrote several amicus briefs on behalf of ADF and spoke at a number of ADF events. ADF has been criticized for opposing LGBT rights. In 2007, Rushing had a summer law clerkship with the Department of Justice.

After graduating from law school, Rushing clerked for then-Judge Neil Gorsuch of the United States Court of Appeals for the Tenth Circuit from 2007 to 2008 and Judge David B. Sentelle of the United States Court of Appeals for the District of Columbia Circuit from 2008 to 2009.

From 2009 to 2010, Rushing was an associate at Williams & Connolly in Washington, D.C. She clerked for Associate Justice Clarence Thomas of the Supreme Court of the United States during the 2010–2011 term. Following the end of her clerkship in 2011, Rushing rejoined Williams & Connolly in its Washington, D.C. office under Kannon Shanmugam. Rushing became a member of the Federalist Society in 2012. She volunteered as a legal advisor to Mitt Romney's 2012 presidential campaign. Rushing was named partner at Williams & Connolly in January 2017. After being appointed to the Fourth Circuit, she left Williams & Connolly.

Federal judicial service 

On August 27, 2018, President Donald Trump announced his intent to nominate Rushing to serve as a United States Circuit Judge of the United States Court of Appeals for the Fourth Circuit. Her official nomination was received on the same day by the United States Senate. She was nominated to the seat being vacated by Allyson Kay Duncan, who previously announced her intention to assume senior status upon the confirmation of her successor. On October 17, 2018, a hearing on her nomination was held before the Senate Judiciary Committee. Rushing has argued that there are "both moral and practical" reasons to ban same-sex marriage. During Rushing's confirmation hearing, she was questioned about her ties to the ADF. Rushing was asked if she would recuse herself from ADF-related cases if confirmed. She replied: "I would determine the appropriate action with the input of the parties, consultation of these rules and ethical canons, and consultation with my colleagues." Asked about ADF being labeled a "hate group" by the Southern Poverty Law Center, Rushing said: "Hate is wrong, and it should have no place in our society. In my experience with ADF, I have not witnessed anyone expressing or advocating hate."

On January 3, 2019, her nomination was returned to the President under Rule XXXI, Paragraph 6 of the United States Senate. On January 23, 2019, President Trump announced his intent to renominate Rushing for a federal judgeship. Her nomination was sent to the Senate later that day. On February 7, 2019, her nomination was reported out of committee by a 12–10 vote. On March 4, 2019, the Senate invoked cloture on her nomination by a 52–43 vote. On March 5, 2019, Rushing was confirmed by a 53–44 vote. At the time of her confirmation, she was the youngest federal judge in the United States. Rushing received her judicial commission on March 21, 2019.

On September 9, 2020, President Trump named Rushing as a potential choice to fill a U.S. Supreme Court vacancy if one should open. After the death of U.S. Supreme Court Justice Ruth Bader Ginsburg on September 18, President Trump briefly considered nominating Rushing to replace her; however, he chose Judge Amy Coney Barrett of the U.S. Court of Appeals for the Seventh Circuit instead.

See also 
 Donald Trump judicial appointment controversies
 List of law clerks of the Supreme Court of the United States (Seat 10)
 Donald Trump Supreme Court candidates

References

Selected publications

External links 
 
 
 Profile at Williams & Connolly
 Who is Allison Jones Rushing, National Review

1982 births
Living people
21st-century American women lawyers
21st-century American lawyers
21st-century American judges
21st-century American women judges
Duke University School of Law alumni
Federalist Society members
Judges of the United States Court of Appeals for the Fourth Circuit
Law clerks of the Supreme Court of the United States
Lawyers from Washington, D.C.
North Carolina lawyers
People from Flat Rock, Henderson County, North Carolina
United States court of appeals judges appointed by Donald Trump
Wake Forest University alumni
Williams & Connolly people